Xcuse Me is a 2003 Hindi comedy-drama film. It is the sequel to N. Chandra's 2001 film Style.

Plot
Bantu/Nehal (Sharman Joshi) and Chantu/Amit (Sahil Khan) are unemployed, and are not able to get any jobs due to lack of experience. They come across an advertisement for a hotel management program in Goa, and make their way there. Once there, they hoodwink the trainer by posing as the nephew of the owner of the hotel, and thus enroll themselves in the training course. In the course of the program, they expose several employees and guests as cheats, earning their wrath but also the admiration of the two daughters of the hotel owners. Things turn sore for the two when the guests and former employees get together to avenge their humiliation.

Cast
Sharman Joshi as Nehal (Bantu) / Maharaja of Janakpur
Sahil Khan as Amit (Chantu) / Senapati / Sultan Bukhara's PA
Sudhir Dalvi as Kelkar 
Sonali Joshi as Soniya Khanna 
Mushtaq Khan as Gomes
Monica Patel as Gomes' wife
Jaya Seal as Monica Khurana 
Shashi Sharma as Janakpur Ki Maharani 
Saurabh Shukla as Mr. Gill, Institute Manager
Snehal Dabi as Sahiba (Hotel Owner)
 Dilip Rawal as Secretary
 Hemant Jha as Khanna
 Muni Jha as Khurana
 Darshan Zariwala as Principal Sardesai
 Dilip Rawal as Maharani of Janakpur's PA

Soundtrack
The music score was given by Sanjeev-Darshan and Abbas Katka penned the lyrics.

References

External links
 

2003 films
2003 comedy-drama films
2000s Hindi-language films
2000s Urdu-language films
Urdu-language Indian films
Indian sequel films
Films directed by N. Chandra
Films scored by Sanjeev Darshan
Indian comedy-drama films